Liuva may refer to:

 Liuva I (died c. 572), Visigothic King
 Liuva II, Visigothic King of Hispania, Septimania and Galicia from 601 to 603
 Liuva (died c. 680), bishop of Braga, Portugal